Arbanasce, is a village in Serbia in the municipality Merošina in Nisava district . According to the census of 2002, there were 568 people (according to the census of 1991, there were 679 inhabitants).

Demographics
In the village Arbanasce live 460 adult inhabitants, and the average age is 42.3 years (42.3 for men and 42.4 for women). The village has 158 households, and the average number of members per household is 3.59.
This village is largely populated by Serbs (according to the census of 2002.) and in the last three censuses, there was a decline in population.

External links 
  Satellite view of Arbanasce
  Arbanasce

Populated places in Nišava District